The women's long jump at the 1962 British Empire and Commonwealth Games as part of the athletics programme was held at the Perry Lakes Stadium on Saturday 1 December 1962.

Kilborn won by one inch ahead of her fellow countrywomen Helen Frith, her training partner and Janet Knee. Bickle's jump was well ahead of the games record set by Yvette Williams of New Zealand set in Vancouver eight years prior but due to the tailwind could not be ratified.

This was one five events at the 1962 Games where Australia won the clean sweep of medals. The others were the women's high jump, the men's 440 yard freestyle, men's 1650 yard freestyle and the men's 220 yard butterfly.

Records

Final

References

Women's long jump
1962